Joteghanashyam is a village and a gram panchayat in Daspur II CD Block in Ghatal subdivision of Paschim Medinipur district in the state of West Bengal, India.

Geography
There are six villages under Joteghanashyam Gram Panchayat. They are Joteghanashyam, Satpota, Gourichak, Dongabhanga, Gomokpota, and Narayanchak.

Demographics
As per 2011 Census of India Joteghanashaym had a total population of 15,200 of which 7,833 (52%) were males and 7,367 (48%) were females. Population below 6 years was 1,616. The total number of literates in Joteghanashyam was 11,851 (77.97% of the population over 6 years).

Education
Joteghanashyam Nilmoni High School 
Govt. ITI DASPUR II 
JOTEGHANASHYAM MOHAN KARTICK TEACHER'S TRAINING COLLEGE

References

Villages in Paschim Medinipur district